Polly Thayer (Starr) (1904–2006) was a Boston painter and pastel artist. When she was still in her twenties she became known for portraits and figure compositions in the tradition of the Boston School, but took a more Modernist approach after leaving academia.  She became increasingly interested in conveying the invisible essences of landscape, flowers and living creatures as her career developed, and was noted for the skilled draftsmanship which provided the substructure of her work.

Biography

Background and names 
Named Ethel Randolph Thayer after her mother, the artist was the daughter of Harvard Law School Dean Ezra Ripley Thayer and Ethel Randolph Thayer, and granddaughter of legal scholar James Bradley Thayer. The love of exactitude brought out by her early upbringing in this vigorously intellectual family was tempered by the spiritual heritage of her Transcendentalist forebears, among whom was Ralph Waldo Emerson.

Although she signed some of her early paintings Ethel Thayer, she had been known as Polly since childhood, and by the end of the 1920s generally signed her work Polly Thayer.  She continued to use Polly Thayer as her brush name after she was married, although in 1967 she changed her name legally from Ethel Randolph Starr to Polly Thayer Starr.  Toward the end of her career she chose to identify herself professionally as Polly Thayer (Starr), but never used that name as a signature.

Education 
Thayer attended Winsor School in Boston and showed an early aptitude for drawing which her mother encouraged by arranging for her to take after-school lessons with Beatrice Van Ness, who had been a student of Benson, Tarbell and Philip L. Hale.   She transferred to Westover School in Middlebury, CT, and after graduation embarked with her mother and brother on a tour of the Orient which culminated in her witnessing the Great Kantō earthquake of 1923, an event she viewed as a turning point in her perception of life.

That autumn Thayer entered the School of the Museum of Fine Arts, Boston, where she studied figure drawing with Hale and portrait painting with Leslie Prince Thompson for about a year and a half, when she left to study privately with Hale.  While still under Hale's tutelage she painted a large nude, Circles, which in 1929 was awarded the National Academy of Design's coveted Julius Hallgarten Prize.  She also studied in 1924 with Charles W. Hawthorne, who “keyed up the palette a lot” with his outdoor classes in Provincetown.

Encouraged by Royal Cortissoz of the New York Herald Tribune, who wrote to her that “The [Prado] is like a university and to copy Velasquez there is like listening to one master with a dozen others putting their oars in the recesses,” Thayer traveled to Spain in 1930, and became particularly fascinated with Goya before continuing her studies in France.  She rented the studio-apartment of Waldo Pierce in Paris, where she worked while attending life drawing classes at the studio of André Lhote.  In subsequent years she studied further with Harry Wickey at the Art Students League of New York; Jean Despujols at the École des Beaux-Arts, Fontainebleau; Carl Nelson in Boston; and Hans Hofmann in Provincetown.

Exhibitions 
Thayer's first solo exhibition, at Doll & Richards in Boston, opening on New Year's Eve, 1930, was so well received that the Globe  reviewer declared it “surely settles her status as one of the foremost painters in the country.”   It brought her commissions for eighteen portraits, many of which she exhibited at Wildenstein's in New York the following year.  Among the galleries that subsequently gave her solo shows were the Sessler Gallery in Philadelphia; Contemporary Arts and Pietrantonio Galleries in New York; and in Boston the Guild of Boston Artists, Grace Horne Galleries, Child's Gallery, The Copley Society, the St. Botolph Club and the Boston Public Library.  In her later years she renewed an early affiliation with Vose Galleries which she maintained for the rest of her life.   In 2001 she was the only living artist included in the Boston Museum of Fine Arts exhibition, "A Studio of Her Own", and a banner of her portrait of May Sarton hung over the entrance to the Museum.

Social and spiritual life 
After many years’ apprehension as to how marriage would affect her artistic impetus, Thayer married Donald C. Starr, attorney, sportsman, musician and yachtsman, in Genoa in 1933, when he was midway on a voyage around the world with six friends in his schooner 'Pilgrim'.  She herself did not take to sailing, and a few years later, when after two weeks on the water she asked to be put ashore at Old Lyme, Connecticut, she saw the land as she had never seen it before.  She began a series of landscape paintings which were characterized by D. Rhodes Johnson as “the work of a folk artist with technical training...It has the freshness of the conception of a primitive, but is never out of drawing.”  The portrait of May Sarton, done around the same time, evinces a different aspect of this new freedom of expression, as Thayer found herself experimenting with portraiture in a world not constrained by tonal values.

The Starrs had two daughters, Victoria and Dinah, the first born in 1940.  In 1942 Thayer joined the Society of Friends (Quakers), which from that time became an important part of her life and identity.  She took an active interest in many educational, charitable and cultural institutions, among them the Boston Public Library and the Institute of Contemporary Art,  and was especially devoted to the causes of peace and non-violence. She also joined the Nucleus and the Tuesday Club, which met to discuss topics of current interest.  The spirit of some of those meetings is preserved in small sketches she made while she listened.

Although she was fortunate enough to have domestic help for support in some of her household and family duties, Thayer was reluctant to spend what time she had on organization and promotion.  Robert F. Brown of the Smithsonian Archives of American art concluded after several interviews in which Thayer had been asked little about her later work, “Thayer freely admitted that the demands of child-rearing, social life, and with her conversion to Quakerism, an increasing absorption in progressive social concerns, caused her artistic career to go into permanent eclipse.”  The lower profile of her career, however, did not in fact mean that she was any less ardent in her endeavors, and the six solo exhibitions she did mount in the decades between the birth of her first child and the loss of her vision in the 1990s attest to the force of her artistic activity.  She continued her work in portraiture, while her more private pursuits included explorations into the nature of landscape, flowers and animals, especially cats, always seeking to reveal their essential being.  “The only way I can see or understand is that of through the visible to the invisible reality,” she commented.

Early in her career, she worked winters at her home in Boston and summers at Weir River Farm in Hingham.

Later years 
Thayer had long been fascinated by the dynamics, meaning and variety of visual experience. In 1981 the Friends Journal published her essay “On Seeing,” a paper she continued to refine until she was ninety-seven, and around the same time she learned that she had glaucoma, which was later complicated by macular degeneration.  Increasingly aware of the fragility of her vision, she concentrated on lavish pastels of gladiolas with their bees and an increasingly abstract sequence of cyclamen flowers drawn in chalk on black paper with touches of color, as well as delicate series of graphite drawings based on the life cycle of the thistle.  In 1992 she completed her last major work, a charcoal self-portrait which is notable for the luminosity of one side of her face and the darkness of the other. Between the time she became unable to practice her craft and her death in 2006, the stature of her work was recognized in eleven solo exhibitions.

Notable works 
Circles, c. 1928, "is the painting that established Thayer as a major talent in America and won her a prestigious Hallgarten Prize at the National Academy of Design in 1929." "This particular picture seemed like a challenge to the distortionists, whose work usually required considerable literary subtlety and aimless phraseology by way of explanation.  That picture didn’t have to be explained.  Here was the healthy body of a young woman, done to the life.  It was honest.”
In Thayer's self-portrait The Algerian Tunic, c. 1927, "she gazes at the viewer directly, and she holds her brush in midair, just about to use it. Thayer's evident intellectual curiosity led her to explore a modern vocabulary in her later work, leaving behind the more traditional approach of many Boston painters."
"Miss May Sarton", 1936 "documents the friendship of an artist and a sitter who have made significant contributions to American culture. [It was] purchased nearly fifty years ago by Paul J. Sachs, then the associate director of the Fogg Art Museum, and lent to the sitter with the proviso that it eventually be donated to the Fogg." “May Sarton, which is splendid in color and an absolutely painterly presentation, is drawn with a special kind of nervous understanding.  It comes off as few modern portraits do.”
"My Childhood Trees", c. 1938, "became one of fewer than ten paintings in the Museum’s American collection at that time that could be characterized as modern (even including the Ashcan School) and it was the first one to have been painted by a Boston artist,” according to Erica Hirshler, Croll Senior Curator of American Paintings at the Boston Museum of Fine Arts.
Boston Globe critic Sebastian Smee commented of  Shopping for Furs that "The bored, dispirited face of Thayer’s anonymous sitter  is unlike anything I’ve ever seen in art: self-possession, deep exhaustion, and a longing for release all rolled into one... The jaunty hat and dangling left hand, meanwhile, communicate splendid insouciance"
Soldiers, 1944:  Asked in her later years to identify some of her most treasured work, Thayer replied: “During World War II, I went out nightly to the Officers’ Club in Boston to do pencil drawings of the young men, which I gave to them... The soldiers came from all over the country, passing through Boston on their way to being shipped out. The poignancy of those young men who were going to war, who might never see the year out, had something to do with those drawings.”
Iris, "created in a seamless blend of watercolor and pastel, is a master work where color seems to unite form and space into a shifting composition. Some areas of the flower appear solid and real; in other areas the gossamer petals seem to be theoretical, as if composed of form and space or of a luminous atmosphere.”.

References

Further reading 
 Burgard, Timothy Anglin. "Polly Thayer and May Sarton: Portrait of the Artists as Young Women."  Harvard University Art Museums Review 1994.  (An extensive correspondence between Polly Thayer (Starr) and May Sarton has been preserved, some of it in the Berg Collection of the New York Public Library.)
 Carsten, Robert K. “Polly Thayer Starr.” Pastel Journal  October 2005:28-35.
 Gerdts, William H. and Nancy Hall-Duncan. “The Great American Nude" American Art Review August 2002:160-65.
 Grob, Mollie C. “Reflections: One’s Life Work; Polly Thayer Starr’s Conversation with Mollie C. Grob."  Brookhaven Voice, Lexington, MA March, 2001:6-7.
 Hirshler, Erica. A Studio of Her Own: Women Artists in Boston 1870-1940. Boston: MFA Publications, 2001.

External links 
 Polly Thayer (Starr) official website.
 Smithsonian Archives of American Art Oral History Interview with Polly Thayer.
 “Finding the Wit in ‘Shopping for Furs.’” by Sebastian Smee
 Polly Thayer (Starr): Poetry of Heart and Hand (This is the full-length version of a biographical essay which appeared in compressed form in Poetry of Hand & Spirit, Paintings and Drawings by Polly Thayer (Starr). Boston:2001).
  of works by Polly Thayer Starr, narrated in the artist's voice from interviews recorded 1998-2006.

Artists from Boston
Painters from Massachusetts
American portrait painters
American draughtsmen
American Quakers
1904 births
2006 deaths
Cat artists
Landscape artists
Cultural history of Boston
Modern painters
20th-century American painters
20th-century American philanthropists
Pastel artists